Mohamed Al-Hamar or Mohammad Alhamar (born 4 September 1971) is a Kuwaiti fencer. He competed in the épée events at the 1988 and 1992 Summer Olympics.

References

External links
 

1971 births
Living people
Kuwaiti male épée fencers
Olympic fencers of Kuwait
Fencers at the 1988 Summer Olympics
Fencers at the 1992 Summer Olympics